Saeed Mehdiyoun (1928 - died 15 August 1980) was an Iranian fighter pilot. He was appointed as the commander of Imperial Iranian Air Force in mid-February 1979 replacing Amir Hossein Rabii in the post. However, he was ousted two days later for lack of popularity among the subordinate personnel. While trying to flee the country, he was arrested for taking part in Nojeh coup plot and subsequently executed for it on 15 August 1980.

References

External links

1980 deaths
Commanders of Islamic Republic of Iran Air Force
Imperial Iranian Army lieutenant generals
Military personnel executed during the Iranian Revolution